Molly Flaherty (10 May 1914 – 13 January 1989) was an Australian cricket player. Flaherty played six test matches for the Australia national women's cricket team.  She played domestic cricket for the New South Wales women's cricket team as both an opening bowler and a batter.

References

1914 births
1989 deaths
Australia women Test cricketers